Minggot is a village in Hingk district, Arfak Mountains Regency in West Papua province, Indonesia. Its population is 169.

Climate
Minggot has a cold subtropical highland climate (Cfb) with heavy rainfall year-round.

References

Populated places in West Papua